Juan López (born 16 October 1934) is a Peruvian coxswain. He competed in the men's coxed pair event at the 1968 Summer Olympics.

References

1934 births
Living people
Peruvian male rowers
Olympic rowers of Peru
Rowers at the 1968 Summer Olympics
Sportspeople from Lima
Coxswains (rowing)
20th-century Peruvian people